iTunes LP (referred to in pre-launch press by the code name Cocktail) is a format for interactive album artwork introduced by Apple Inc. on September 9, 2009. It is similar to the CMX format being developed by the three major record labels, and operates within the iTunes 9 to iTunes 12 software, allowing the user to view multimedia elements alongside the music. This format is also used to bundle extra content (known as iTunes Extras) with selected movies at the iTunes Store.

iTunes LP downloads use a proprietary file format with the extension .itlp, which is essentially a WebArchive adhering to special conventions using HTML, CSS, JavaScript, CSS Animations, and plists. This technology is referred to in iTunes LP files as TuneKit. On November 28, 2009, the iTunes LP SDK was released to the public.

In 2011, MTV introduced the O Music Awards, intended artists, fans, and innovators at this online awards show. One of the OMAs' inaugural categories was Best iTunes LP. The winner of this category was Pink's Greatest Hits...So Far!!! (Deluxe Edition).

Apple stopped accepting new submissions of iTunes LPs after March 2018. Existing LPs will be deprecated from the store during the remainder of 2018. Customers who have previously purchased an album containing an iTunes LP will still be able to download the additional content using iTunes Match.

iTunes LP list

0–9
 3 Doors Down – Time of My Life
 Thirty Seconds to Mars – This Is War
 50 Cent – Before I Self Destruct

A–B

 A-ha – 25: The Very Best Of
 Above & Beyond – Group Therapy
Adam Lambert – For Your Entertainment
Adam Lambert – Trespassing
Aerosmith – Music From Another Dimension!
AFI – Crash Love
Alesana – A Place Where the Sun Is Silent
Alex Band – We've All Been There
Alice in Chains – Black Gives Way to Blue
Alicia Keys – Songs in A Minor
All Sons & Daughters – Live
Alt-J – An Awesome Wave
Andrew Lloyd Webber – Love Never Dies
Anthrax – Worship Music
Antony & The Johnsons – Swanlights
Aphex Twin -Syro
Augustana – Augustana
Avenged Sevenfold – Nightmare
Avril Lavigne – Goodbye Lullaby
Avril Lavigne – Avril Lavigne
Axelle Red – Un coeur comme le mien
Ayọ – Billie-Eve
B.o.B – Don't Let Me Fall (EP)
The Baseballs – Strings 'n' Stripes
The Beach Boys – The SMiLE Sessions
Beady Eye – Different Gear, Still Speeding
The Beatles – The Beatles Box Set
The Beatles – Please Please Me
The Beatles – With The Beatles
The Beatles – A Hard Day's Night
The Beatles – Beatles For Sale
The Beatles – Help!
The Beatles – Rubber Soul
The Beatles – Revolver
The Beatles – Sgt. Pepper's Lonely Hearts Club Band
The Beatles – Magical Mystery Tour
The Beatles – The Beatles (White Album)
The Beatles – Yellow Submarine
The Beatles – Abbey Road
The Beatles – Let It Be
The Beatles – Past Masters
The Beatles – Anthology Box Set
The Beatles – Anthology 1
The Beatles – Anthology 2
The Beatles – Anthology 3
The Beatles – LOVE
The Beatles – 1962-1966
The Beatles – 1967-1970
The Beatles – 1
The Beatles - The U.S. Albums
Beatsteaks – Boom Box
Ben Folds & Nick Hornby – Lonely Avenue
Between the Buried and Me – The Parallax II: Future Sequence
Beyoncé – 4
Biffy Clyro – Only Revolutions
The Black Crowes – Croweology
Blessthefall – Awakening
Blue Rodeo – The Things We Left Behind
Bluejuice – Company
Bob Dylan – Highway 61 Revisited
Bob Dylan – Tempest
Bon Jovi – Greatest Hits: The Ultimate Collection
Booba – Lunatic
Boy & Bear – Moonfire
Brad Paisley – This Is Country Music
Brandy – Two Eleven
Britney Spears – Femme Fatale
Britney Spears – Britney Jean
Britney Spears – Glory
Britt Nicole – Gold 
Broken Bells – Broken Bells
Brooke Fraser – Flags
Bruce Springsteen – The Promise: The Darkness On the Edge of Town Story
Bruce Springsteen – Wrecking Ball
Bruno Mars – Doo-Wops & Hooligans
Bruno Mars – Just the Way You Are
Bryan Ferry – Olympia
Buddy Guy – Living Proof

C–G

Cage the Elephant – Thank You Happy Birthday
Cali – La vie est une truite arc-en-ciel qui nage dans mon cœur
Calle 13 – Entren Los Que Quieran
Carlos Baute – Amarte Bien
Charlotte Gainsbourg – IRM
Charly García – 60x60
The Chemical Brothers – Further
Chris Brown – F.A.M.E.
Chelsea Grin  - My Damnation 
Chris Brown – Fortune
Chris Young - Neon
Christina Aguilera – Bionic
Christina Aguilera – Lotus
Christophe Maé – On trace la route
Christy Moore – Folk Tale
Ciara – Ciara
The Civil Wars - Barton Hollow
The Civil Wars - The Civil Wars
The Clash – Sound System
Cro – Raop
Cold Cave – Cherish the Light Years
Cocoon – Where the Oceans End
Daddy Yankee – Mundail
Daft Punk – Random Access Memories
Danger Mouse & Sparklehorse – Dark Night of the Soul
Danny Fernandes – AutomaticLUV
Dave Matthews Band – Big Whiskey and the GrooGrux King
Dave Stewart – The Blackbird Diaries
David Cook – This Loud Morning
Deadmau5 – 4x4=12
Deadmau5 – Album Title Goes Here
Def Leppard – Mirror Ball: Live & More
Depeche Mode – Delta Machine
Derek & The Dominos – Layla and Other Assorted Love Songs
Devo – Something for Everybody
Die Ärzte – Auch
Die drei ??? – Die drei ???, Folge 137: Pfad der Angst
Disturbed – Asylum
The Doors – The Doors: 40th Anniversary Mixes
Elbow – Build a Rocket Boys!
Eli Young Band – Life At Best
Eliza Doolittle – Eliza Doolittle (EP)
Ellie Goulding - Halcyon
Ellis Marsalis – An Open Letter To Thelonious
Elton John and Leon Russell – The Union
Elvis Presley – Viva Elvis
Emmylou Harris – Hard Bargain
Eric Clapton – Clapton
Eric Prydz – Eric Prydz Presents Pryda
Eskimo Joe – Ghosts of the Past
Eve 6 – Speak in Code
Every Avenue – Bad Habits
Die Fantastischen Vier – Für dich immer noch Fanta Sie
Fettes Brot – Fettes
Fettes Brot – Brot
Fiona Apple – The Idler Wheel...
Foals – Total Life Forever
For Today – Immortal
Foster the People – Torches
Francesca Battistelli – Hundred More Years
Francesco Tristano – BachCage
Frida Gold – Juwel
Gavin DeGraw – Sweeter
George Harrison and friends – The Concert for Bangladesh
George Harrison – The Apple Years 1968–75 box set
George Michael – Faith
Girls' Generation – I Got a Boy
Glasvegas – Euphoric /// Heartbreak \\\
Glee Cast – Glee: The Music, The Graduation Album
Gloria Trevi – Gloria
Gorillaz – On Melancholy Hill (EP)
Gorillaz – Plastic Beach
Gotan Project – Tango 3.0
Grateful Dead – American Beauty
Gregory Porter – Liquid Spirit
Grinderman – Grinderman 2
GUNSHIP – GUNSHIP

H–M

Harry Hill – Funny Times
Heart – Red Velvet Car
Hillsong Live – God Is Able (Live)
Hillsong Live – Cornerstone (Live)
Hillsong United – Aftermath
Hillsong United – Zion
Hinder – All American Nightmare
Hot Chelle Rae – Whatever
Hugh Laurie – Let Them Talk
Imagine Dragons  - Night Visions (Deluxe Edition)
Incubus – If Not Now, When?
Iron Maiden – The Final Frontier
Isaac Carree – Uncommon Me
Israel Houghton – Love God. Love People.
In Flames - Siren Charms
Jack Johnson – En Concert
Jacques Dutronc – Et vous, et vous, et vous...
Jake Owen – Days of Gold
James Blunt – Some Kind of Trouble
Jamie Foxx – Best Night of My Life
Jamie Woon – Mirrorwriting
Janelle Monáe – The ArchAndroid (Suites II and III)
Jason Aldean – My Kinda Party
Jason Derulo – What If (EP)
Jay-Z – The Blueprint 3
JBO – Killeralbum
Jean-Louis Aubert – Roc' éclair
Jeff Beck – Emotion & Commotion
Jehro – Cantina Paradise
Jennifer Hudson – I Remember Me
Jennifer Lopez – Dance Again... the Hits
Jennifer Rostock – Mit Haut und Haar
Jill Scott – The Light of the Sun
Jimi Hendrix – Valleys of Neptune
The Jimi Hendrix Experience – Winterland (Live)
Joachim Witt – DOM
John Butler Trio – April Uprising
John Lennon – Power to the People: The Hits
John Lennon and Yoko Ono – Double Fantasy Stripped Down
John Mayer – Battle Studies
Johnny Hallyday – Jamais seul
Josh Groban – Illuminations
Joy Division – +- Singles 1978-80
Juanes – P.A.R.C.E.
Julieta Venegas – Otra Cosa
Justin Timberlake – The 20/20 Experience
Justin Timberlake – The 20/20 Experience – 2 of 2
Justin Timberlake – The 20/20 Experience – The Complete Experience
k.d. lang – Recollection
Keane – Night Train
Kenny Chesney – Hemingway's Whiskey
Kenny Chesney – The Big Revival
Keren Ann – 101
Kesha – Cannibal
Kesha – Animal + Cannibal
Kesha – Warrior
Kidz Bop Kids – Kidz Bop 20
Kimbra – Vows
Kings of Leon – Come Around Sundown
Kirk Franklin – Hello Fear
The Kooks – Junk of the Heart
Korn – Korn III: Remember Who You Are
Kristin Chenoweth – Some Lessons Learned
KT Tunstall – Tiger Suit
Kusuo – ±1
Kylie Minogue – Aphrodite
Lady Gaga - Born This Way
Lang Lang – Live in Vienna
Laura Marling – I Speak Because I Can
Laura Marling – A Creature I Don't Know
Lauren Pritchard – Wasted In Jackson
Lenka – Two
Lenny Kravitz – Black and White America
Lifehouse – Smoke & Mirrors
Linkin Park – A Thousand Suns
Los Lonely Boys – Rockpango
M.I.A. – Maya
McAlister Kemp – Country Proud
Madina Lake – World War III
Madonna – Sticky & Sweet Tour
The Maine – Black & White
The Maine – In Darkness and in Light
Maná – Drama Y Luz
Manchester Orchestra – Simple Math
Mariah Carey – Memoirs of an Imperfect Angel
Mark Ronson & The Business Intl. – Record Collection
Mark Ruff Ryder Presents – Mark Ruff Ryder
Mary Mary – Something Big
Masayoshi Yamazaki (山崎まさよし) – Hobo's Music
Massive Attack – Heligoland
Matt Cardle – Letters
Michael Franti & Spearhead – The Sound of Sunshine
Michael Jackson – Michael
Michael Jackson – Michael Jackson's Vision
Middle Brother – Middle Brother
Miguel – Kaleidoscope Dream
Miike Snow – "Happy to You"
Mika – The Boy Who Knew Too Much
Mike Posner – 31 Minutes to Takeoff
Miles Davis – Bitches Brew
Miley Cyrus – Bangerz
Miloš Karadaglić – Miloš
MiMi – Road To Last Night
Miranda Lambert – Platinum
Mirrors – Lights and Offerings
Moby – Destroyed
Moby – Innocents
Monica – New Life
Muse – The Resistance
My Chemical Romance – Danger Days: The True Lives of the Fabulous Killjoys
My Morning Jacket – Circuital

N–S

Negramaro –Casa 69
Never Shout Never – Harmony
Never Shout Never – Melody
Nine Inch Nails - Hesitation Marks
NKOTBSB –NKOTBSB
Noel Gallagher – Noel Gallagher's High Flying Birds
Norah Jones – Come Away with Me
Oasis – Time Flies... 1994-2009
Oh Land – Oh Land
OneRepublic – Waking Up
One Direction – Up All Night
One Direction – Take Me Home
One Direction – Midnight Memories
The Overtones – Good Ol' Fashioned Love
Pantera – Cowboys from Hell
Paolo Nutini – Sunny Side Up
Papa VS Pretty – United In Isolation
Paramore – Brand New Eyes
Paul McCartney – Good Evening New York City
Paul van Dyk – Gatecrasher Anthems - Paul Van Dyk
Pearl Jam – Backspacer
Pearl Jam – Live on Ten Legs
Pearl Jam – Vs. & Vitalogy
Pendulum – Immersion
Pete Yorn – Musicforthemorningafter
Peter Bjorn and John – Gimme Some
Peter Frampton – Frampton Comes Alive!
Peter Gabriel – So+
Peter Gabriel – Scratch My Back
Phil Collins – Going Back
Pink – Greatest Hits... So Far!!!
Pink – The Truth About Love
Pink Floyd – Meddle
Pink Floyd – Wish You Were Here
Pink Floyd - The Dark Side of the Moon (Remastered)
Pink Floyd - The Wall (Remastered)
Pitbull – Planet Pit
Plan B – The Defamation of Strickland Banks
P.O.D. – Murdered Love
Powderfinger – Golden Rule
Primal Scream – Screamadelica
Professor Green – I Need You Tonight (EP)
Professor Green – Just Be Good to Green (EP)
Queen – Queen
Queen – Queen II
Queen – Sheer Heart Attack
Queen – A Night at the Opera
Queen – A Day at the Races
Queen – News of the World
Queen – Jazz
Queen – The Game
Queen – Flash Gordon
Queen – Hot Space
R. Kelly – Love Letter
R.E.M. – Collapse Into Now
Radiohead – OK Computer
Raphael Saadiq – Stone Rollin'
The Rat Pack – The Very Best of the Rat Pack
Ravi Shankar and George Harrison – Collaborations
Ray Davies – See My Friends
The Red Jumpsuit Apparatus – Am I the Enemy
Regina Spektor – Live In London
Robbie Williams – In and Out of Consciousness: Greatest Hits 1990–2010
Roll Deep – Good Times (EP)
The Rolling Stones – Get Yer Ya-Ya's Out! The Rolling Stones in Concert
The Rolling Stones – Exile On Main St
Ronnie Dunn – Ronnie Dunn
Roy Orbison – The Monument Singles Collection
Rumer – Seasons of My Soul
Santana – Guitar Heaven: The Greatest Guitar Classics of All Time
Sara Evans – Stronger
Saves the Day – Daybreak
Seal – 6: Commitment
Selena Gomez & the Scene – When the Sun Goes Down
Serge Gainsbourg – Intégrale: Serge Gainsbourg
Serj Tankian – Elect the Dead Symphony
Serj Tankian – Imperfect Harmonies
Shakira – She Wolf
Shinee – Chapter 1. Dream Girl – The Misconceptions of You
Sido – MTV Unplugged Live aus'm MV
Sigur Rós – Valtari
Sir Simon Rattle & Berliner Philharmoniker – Tchaikovsky: The Nutcracker: Complete Ballet
Simply Red – Farewell (Live at Sydney Opera House)
Sixx:A.M. – This Is Gonna Hurt
Skunk Anansie – Wonderlustre
Sky Ferreira – One (EP)
Slow Club – Paradise)
Smashing Pumpkins – Oceania
Snoop Dogg – More Malice
Something for Kate – Leave Your Soul to Science
Soundgarden – Telephantasm
Steel Panther - "All You Can Eat"
Stevie Nicks – In Your Dreams
The Strokes – Angles
Suede – Suede
Suede – Dog Man Star
Suede – Coming Up
Sugarland – The Incredible Machine
The Summer Set – Everything's Fine
Superfly – Wildflower & Cover Songs: Complete Best 'Track 3'
Swedish House Mafia – Until One
Syd Barrett – An Introduction to Syd Barrett
Sylvie Vartan – Soleil bleu

T–Z

Take That – Progress
Talib Kweli & Hi-Tek – Reflection Eternal: Revolutions Per Minute
Tame Impala – Innerspeaker
Taylor Swift – Fearless
Taylor Swift – Red
Tedeschi Trucks Band – Revelator
Thees Uhlmann – Thees Uhlmann
These Kids Wear Crowns – Jumpstart
Three Days Grace - Transit of Venus
Thomas D – Lektionen in Demut 11.0
Till Brönner – At the End of the Day
Tim Bendzko – Wenn Worte meine Sprache wären
Times of Grace – The Hymn of a Broken Man
Tinie Tempah – Pass Out (EP)
Tinie Tempah – Frisky (EP)
tobyMac – Eye On It
Tom Petty & The Heartbreakers – The Live Anthology
Tom Petty & The Heartbreakers – Mojo
Toploader – Only Human
Tori Amos – Night of Hunters
Train – California 37
Trey Songz – Passion, Pain & Pleasure
Trin-i-tee 5:7 – Angel & Chanelle
Tyrese – Tyrese Gibson's Mayhem! (Comic Book #1 & Single)
Tyrese – Tyrese Gibson's Mayhem! (Comic Book #2 & Single)
Tyrese – Tyrese Gibson's Mayhem! (Comic Book #3 & Single)
Underoath – Ø (Disambiguation)
Underworld – Barking
Usher – Raymond v. Raymond
Usher – Looking 4 Myself
Vanessa Carlton – Rabbits on the Run
Various Artists – The Brit Awards Album 2011 (Plus Bonus BRITs School Tracks)
Various Artists – Gift Wrapped, Vol. II: Snowed In
Various Artists – Introducing the Classical Guide
Various Artists – iTunes Holiday Sampler
Various Artists – iTunes Festival: London 2010
Various Artists – Now That's What I Call Xmas!
Various Artists – Old Grey Whistle Test (40th Anniversary)
Various Artists – Revolution Overdrive: Songs of Liberty
Various Artists – StarCraft II: Wings of Liberty soundtrack
Various Artists – Twistable, Turnable Man: A Musical Tribute to the Songs of Shel Silverstein
Vasco Rossi – Vivere o niente
Véronique Sanson – Plusieurs lunes
 "Weird Al" Yankovic – Alpocalypse
 The Who – Quadrophenia
 Wings & Paul McCartney – Band on the Run (Remastered)
 The Wombats – The Wombats Proudly Present: This Modern Glitch
 Wonder Girls – Wonder Party
 Yael Naïm – She Was a Boy
 Yannick Noah – Frontières
 You Me At Six – Sinners Never Sleep
 You Me At Six – Cavalier Youth (Deluxe Edition)
 Zac Brown Band – You Get What You Give
 Zazie – Za7ie
 Zero 7 – Record: The Best of Zero 7
 Zoé – MTV Unplugged: Música de Fondo

References

External links
 Developer resources
 iTunesLP.net – Tutorials for creating your own iTunes LPs 

Computer file formats
Digital container formats
ITunes
Computer-related introductions in 2009